Canadian Tire Centre is an OC Transpo Station in Ottawa, Ontario.

The station also has a park and ride facility served weekdays between the hours of 5:45 a.m. and 6:30 p.m.

There is an on-ramp to eastbound Highway 417 for buses from the station.

Service

The following routes serve Canadian Tire Centre station as of October 6, 2019:

See also
 Ottawa Rapid Transit
Canadian Tire Centre

References

External links
Canadian Tire Centre Station station page
Connexion 400 Map

Transitway (Ottawa) stations